Rammelsbergite is a nickel arsenide mineral with formula NiAs2. It forms metallic silvery to tin white to reddish orthorhombic prismatic crystals, and is usually massive in form. It has a Mohs hardness of 5.5 and a specific gravity of 7.1.

It was first described in 1854 from its type locality in the Schneeberg District in Saxony, Germany. It was named after the German chemist and mineralogist, Karl Friedrich August Rammelsberg (1813–1899).

It occurs as a hydrothermal mineral in medium temperature veins association with skutterudite, safflorite, lollingite, nickeline, native bismuth, native silver, algodonite, domeykite and uraninite.

See also
 List of minerals named after people

References

Mineral Galleries
 

Nickel minerals
Arsenide minerals
Orthorhombic minerals
Minerals in space group 58